Building at 813–815 W. Second Street is an historic building located near downtown Davenport, Iowa, United States. It was listed on the National Register of Historic Places in 1983. The building was built by Lorenz Wahle who was an associate in the German Savings Bank and had formerly worked as a grocer. The date of the building's construction is difficult to discern as the Wahle family owned two buildings on this site between 1870 and 1920. It is significant for its vaguely Neoclassical cast concrete facade, now hidden by metal siding, which is a unique feature in the city. The structure served as a warehouse until it was renovated in 2003 as a gay nightclub named "Club Fusion." In 2012, after the building had been empty for a few years, it was bought and converted into a convenience store and a bar.

References

Neoclassical architecture in Iowa
Buildings and structures in Davenport, Iowa
Commercial buildings on the National Register of Historic Places in Iowa
National Register of Historic Places in Davenport, Iowa
LGBT history in Iowa
Defunct LGBT nightclubs in the United States